Mount Alcantara is a  mountain summit located in British Columbia, Canada.

Description
Mount Alcantara is the highest point in the Blue Range, a subrange of the Canadian Rockies. Precipitation runoff from Alcantara drains into Alcantara and Aurora creeks which are both part of the Cross River watershed. Topographic relief is significant as the summit rises over 1,500 meters (4,920 feet) above Aurora Creek in two kilometers (1.2 mile).

History

Mount Alcantara was named in 1916 to remember the RMS Alcantara, an ocean liner that was converted to an armed merchant cruiser and was sunk by the German raider Greif during the First World War. The mountain's toponym was officially adopted October 12, 1966, by the Geographical Names Board of Canada.

The first ascent of the summit was made in 1929 by Kate (Katie) Gardiner with guide Walter Feuz.

Geology

Mount Alcantara is composed of sedimentary rock laid down during the Precambrian to Jurassic periods and was later pushed east and over the top of younger rock during the Laramide orogeny.

Climate

Based on the Köppen climate classification, Mount Alcantara is located in a subarctic climate with cold, snowy winters, and mild summers. Temperatures can drop below −20 °C with wind chill factors below −30 °C.

See also
 
 Geography of British Columbia

References

External links
 Weather: Mount Alcantara
 Mount Alcantara: On-top.ca

Three-thousanders of British Columbia
Canadian Rockies
Kootenay Land District